The Mugwumps were a 1960s folk rock band, based in New York City. It released one self-titled album in 1967 and two singles. The Mugwumps found little success during their short time together in 1964, and are best known for launching the careers of Cass Elliot and Denny Doherty (who went on to co-found the Mamas & the Papas) and John Sebastian and Zal Yanovsky (who co-founded the Lovin' Spoonful).

History
The origin of the band's name is unclear. One source says that it was taken from the William S. Burroughs novel The Naked Lunch. The liner notes for the 2007 re-release of The Mugwumps reports that Jim Hendricks claimed that the name came from music producer Erik Jacobsen. Denny Doherty claimed that the name came from his Newfoundland grandmother. (Historically, "Mugwumps" were dissident American Republicans of 1884, from Algonquian mugquomp, "important person"). 

They largely played remakes of other artists' material with some of their own original songs. Their album was released after the band had split up.
 
Members Cass Elliot and Denny Doherty would become one-half of the Mamas & the Papas (who told the story of The Mugwumps in their hit song "Creeque Alley"), while John Sebastian and Zal Yanovsky would form the Lovin' Spoonful. 

Jim Hendricks formed the Lamp of Childhood, which recorded three singles for Dunhill Records, and had some success as a performer and songwriter. He wrote the top 15 hit "Summer Rain" for Johnny Rivers, and the theme song "Long Lonesome Highway" for the NBC TV show Then Came Bronson.

A different 1960s group known as The Mugwumps, based in Los Angeles and produced by Mike Curb for his Sidewalk label, had no connection to the New York group but reached #127 on the Billboard Bubbling Under Hot 100 chart in 1966 with a cover version of "Jug Band Music", a song John Sebastian wrote for the Lovin' Spoonful's Daydream album.

Discography

Albums
The Mugwumps (Warner Bros. 1967)
Side 1
 Searchin'
 I Don't Wanna Know
 I'll Remember Tonight
 Here It Is Another Day
 Do You Know What I Mean

Side 2
 You Can't Judge a Book By the Cover
 Everybody's Been Talkin'
 Do What They Don't Say
 So Fine

John Sebastian did not appear on this album. Produced by Roy Silver & Bob Cavallo in association with Alan Loeber /A Cavallo & Silver Production. Recorded in August 1964.

Singles
 "I Don't Wanna Know" b/w "I'll Remember Tonight" (1964 Warner Bros. 5471)
 "Searchin'" b/w "Here It Is Another Day" (1967 Warner Bros. 7018)

References

External links
Jim Hendricks Website- Jim Hendricks American Folk Artist

Rock music groups from New York (state)
American folk rock groups
Musical groups from New York City
Musical groups established in 1964
Musical groups disestablished in 1964
Warner Records artists